Pyrus bourgaeana, the Iberian pear, is a close relative of Pyrus communis L. The latter was domesticated about 2500 years ago.  This monoecious small tree (typically 3–6 m high) is widely distributed across the southern Iberian Peninsula and northern Morocco, where it coexists with four Pyrus species: P. communis L., P. cordata Dew., P. spinosa Forssk, and P. nivalis Jacq. Characteristics to discriminate these species are the width of fruit peduncle, petal size, leaf width and petiole length served to the taxa.

Pyrus bourgaeana flowers are white, rarely tinted pink, 2–3 cm diameter, and have five petals. Fruits are non-dehiscent globose pomes weighing ~ 9.5 g, with green or brown skin inconspicuous to birds, copious lenticels permitting scent to emanate, and pulp high in fiber. Each fruit usually contains 2-4 full seeds.

Within the Iberian Peninsula, P. bourgaeana distribution is very fragmented with trees occurring at low densities in small patches of Mediterranean scrubland that are isolated from each other by towns, cultivations, etc. Within these patches, mature trees often are aggregated in small clusters of 8-10 individuals  Iberian pears are remarkably resistant to sicknesses or blight; they are more often killed by storms or high winds than by sickness.

Phenology and interactions with animals 
The Iberian pear flowers during February–March. It is pollinated by wide variety of insects such as bees, flies, and beetles. Each individual produces between 200-450 fruits that ripen and drop to the ground unaided from September to December. Predispersal seed losses by invertebrates (microlepidoptera larvae) are usually low.  Its seeds most frequently are dispersed by mammals. Indeed, mammalian carnivores (badgers Meles meles, red foxes Vulpes vulpes, etc.) often ingest whole fruits fallen to the ground and disperse  ingested seeds away from conspecifics with the capacity of germination. In some areas, however, these dispersers have declined to low densities by hunting and other human activities. Rabbits Oryctolagus cunniculus and some birds also feed on its fruit, eating part of the fruit pulp leaving the uneaten seeds under fruiting trees. Rodents often depredate the uncovered seeds in those fruits partially eaten by pulp feeders.  Ungulates (red deer Cervus elaphus, wild boar Sus scrofa) generally ingest whole fallen fruits but grind ingested seeds and mostly act as seed predators. Rodents also can act as post-dispersal predators of P. bourgaeana seeds. Seeds germinate epigeally either shortly after dispersal, or even within fallen fruits, and do not appear to persist in the soil seed bank. Seedlings emerge from winter to early spring, and extensive mortality occurs on young seedlings due to summer droughts and fungal infection.

The strong aggregated patterning is thought to be the result of several non-exclusive processes. First, by creating the initial template on which post-dispersal processes act, its seed dispersers like foxes and badgers can be partially responsible for P. bourgaena aggregation. Second, dispersal limitation sometimes leads to seedling establishment beneath mother trees, resulting in an aggregated patterning. This is a likely possibility since a fraction of the fruit fallen beneath adult trees are not taken by mammals or are partially depulped by rabbits, without dispersing the seeds. Some seedlings emerge beneath mother trees every season and, eventually, a few of them get established. Finally, rhizome sprouting in response to disturbance could result in clustering if different sprouts emerge from a single individual and eventually produce fruit. In the Doñana National Park (Southwestern Spain), P. bourgaeana experience heavy browsing by red deer Cervus elaphus and sprouts of a range of sizes emerge beneath some trees.  As those shoots grow could eventually reach the adult size leading to tree clustering.

Uses and threats 

Pear wood (of any species) has one of the finest textures of the fruitwoods. It is prized for making woodwind instruments, and pear veneer is used in fine furniture. In southern Spain, the Iberian pear has been used as rootstock for grafting pear cultivars. The fruit is not edible for people.

The major threats are urbanization and agricultural development.

References

External links 

bourgaeana
Flora of Morocco
Flora of Spain
Flora of Portugal
Taxa named by Joseph Decaisne